Don Guest (16 July 1934, in Oklahoma – 23 April 2010, in Tours) was an American film producer, best known for winning the Palme d'Or for a film he produced, Paris, Texas. He also frequently served as a production manager for many prominent directors of the era, including Sam Peckinpah, Peter Bogdanovich, Philip Kaufman, Michelangelo Antonioni. He moved with his family to Los Angeles during the Dust Bowl migration.

Producer credits
Everglades! (1961, TV, associate)
The White Dawn (1974, associate)
Blue Collar (1978)
Hammett (1982)
The Osterman Weekend (1983, associate)
Paris, Texas (1984)
At Close Range (1986)
Shadow of China (1989)

References

American film producers
Film producers from Oklahoma
Palme d'Or winners
1934 births
2010 deaths